William Austin (born 1801) was an English first-class cricketer active in 1827 and 1828. He was born in Cambridge.

Austin made two first-class appearances for the Cambridge Union Club, with both appearances coming against Cambridge University in 1827 and 1828 at the University Ground, Barnwell. Austin scored a total of 59 runs in his two matches, top scoring with 35.

References

1801 births
Year of death unknown
Cricketers from Cambridgeshire
English cricketers
Cambridge Town Club cricketers
Sportspeople from Cambridge